Masaki Niiyama (born 17 June 1993) is a Japanese swimmer. He competed in the men's 50 metre breaststroke event at the 2018 FINA World Swimming Championships (25 m), in Hangzhou, China.

References

External links
 

1993 births
Living people
Japanese male breaststroke swimmers
Place of birth missing (living people)
21st-century Japanese people